P-Model is the eighth studio album by P-Model and the first by the "defrosted" lineup.

Background
In the aftermath of the band's hiatus ("freezing") in 1988, P-Model's members went their own separate ways. After releasing three solo albums, frontman Susumu Hirasawa rebuilt the band out of several backing members from his concerts. The new,  lineup consisted of pre-hiatus P-Model member Hikaru Kotobuki, returning founding member Katsuhiko Akiyama, and associate Yasuchika Fujii.

P-Model officially returned in September 1991.

Composition
On this album, P-Model introduced a machine-like, sci-fi sound to its style, heavily influenced by Amiga computers, which Hirasawa and Kotobuki used for production. This extended to the lyrical themes of the album, being focused on science, technology, and computers.

Track listing

All tracks arranged by Hirasawa, except 2 & 8 by Kotobuki and 5 & 10 by Akiyama. All track titles are stylized in all caps. The total running time of the last track (the last two songs with 3 minutes of silence separating them) is 8:48.

Personnel
P-Model
 Susumu Hirasawa - vocals, electric guitar, synthesizers, Amiga  ("Say" program - lead vocals on "Error of Universe", additional vocals on "Wire Self" and "Clear"), programming, producer, mixing engineer on "Grid"
  - synthesizers, programming, lead vocals on "Clear", backing vocals
 Hikaru Kotobuki - synthesizers, Compact Macintosh, programming, lead vocals on "Lab=01", backing vocals
 Yasuchika Fujii - electronic drums, backing vocals on "Vista"

technical
 Masanori Chinzei - engineer (mixing and recording), backing vocals on "Vista"
 Motohiro Yamada (Eggs), Hajime Nagai (Z's), Shinichi Tomita (Mix), Osamu Konishi (Den), Fumio Hasegawa (Sound Sky), Atsunori Horioka and Tsukasa Okamoto (Sonata Club) - second engineers
 Reiko Miyoshi (Tokyu Fun) - mastering engineer

visuals
 Kiyoshi Inagaki (D.D.T.) - art director, design
 Hideki Namai - photography
 Kazunori Yoshida - hair & make-up
 Akemi Tsujitani - styling
 Takaaki Taguchi - costume design
  (inner, back photos) and Seiko Mikami (back photo) - objet d'art

operations
 Osamu Takeuchi (Polydor K.K.) - director
 I3 Promotion - management
 Yūichi Kenjo - co-producer, backing vocals on "Vista"
 Hiroki Yamaguchi - personal manager
 Shoko Mashio, Takeshi Fujita - publicity coordination
 Tsutomu Fukushima - stage coordination
 Masami Fujii (Pre Octave) - publisher

special thanks
 AC Unit, Korg, Rihito, M, Yasumi Tanaka

Release history

References

External links
 P-MODEL at NO ROOM - The official site of Susumu Hirasawa (P-MODEL)
 
 P-MODEL at Universal Music Japan's official site
 GOLDEN☆BEST (reissue) at Universal Music Japan's official site
 P-MODEL at Tower Records Online

1992 albums
Japanese-language albums
P-Model albums
Polydor Records albums